Rašovice is a municipality and village in Kutná Hora District in the Central Bohemian Region of the Czech Republic. It has about 400 inhabitants.

Administrative parts
Villages of Jindice, Mančice and Netušil are administrative parts of Rašovice.

References

Villages in Kutná Hora District